Cyrtodactylus peguensis, also known as the Thai bow-fingered gecko or Pegu forest gecko,  is a species of gecko that is found in Thailand, western Malaysia, and Myanmar.

References 

Cyrtodactylus
Reptiles of Malaysia
Reptiles of Myanmar
Reptiles of Thailand
Taxa named by George Albert Boulenger
Reptiles described in 1893